Tanja Dezentjé (Tatiana Eleonora Catharina Charlotte Dezentj, born July 8, 1918) was a Dutch woman who fought for the Indonesian National Revolution against the Netherlands. Her mother Eleonara Kinzler was from Belarus and her father Henri Charles Dezentjé son of rich sugar plantation owners in the Dutch East Indies. After the Indonesian Independence she became a diplomat for the Republic of Indonesia. She is featured in the exhibition "Revolusi" at the Dutch Rijksmuseum.

Youth 

Tanya was born on July 8, 1918, in The Hague, although there seems to be some confusion in the sources. When her father died when she was still very young, her mother moved in with her brother in Argentina. When subsequently her mother died she moved to live with her grandmother in Belgium and later The Hague. At that point she already spoke Russian, malesian , French and Dutch. She ended up traveling a lot. She had married three times by the time the Japanese invaded Indonesia. First when she was 16 with a prins from Java, later with an indo-Chinese man and finally with William MacGillavry who was killed during the Japanese occupation. She had a child with each husband.

During the War 
The Dutch intelligence bureau NEFIS portrayed her as a spy  and traitor who supported the Japanese. The Occupying Japanese forces however arrested her and her husband as spies and killed her husband. She took Indonesian citizenship (warga-negara) shortly after the war.

After the war and independence 
When Sukarno declared independence in 1945, Dezentjé worked for the radio station Voice of Free Indonesia in Yogyakarta, which she did in Dutch and French. Because she also spoke Russian, Italian, Spanish and English, she was soon after this also sent out as a diplomat to plead for the Indonesian independence. She was part of the Indonesian delegation for the Asian Relations Conference in 1947. She leads an active but unhappy life traveling and holding speeches defending the role of women in the republic. In 1948 she marries the Indian diplomat Mohammed Abdul, but the marriage only lasts a few years. When Tanya Dezentjé returns to the republic many things have changed and few of her friends are still in power. She does get supported by her old friends Hatta, Roem en Rubiono. She died at the age of 66 in 1982.

References

External links 
 https://www.rijksmuseum.nl/en/stories/exhibitions/revolusi/story/story-tanja-dezentje
 https://fd.nl/samenleving/1428127/tanya-dezentje-een-onverschrokken-indische
 https://www.genealogieonline.nl/en/stamboom-diehl/I11083.php

1918 births
1982 deaths
20th-century Indonesian women politicians
20th-century Indonesian politicians
Indonesian activists
Indonesian women activists
Dutch women activists
Dutch radio presenters
Dutch women radio presenters
Naturalised citizens of Indonesia
Dutch emigrants to Indonesia
Indonesian radio presenters
Indonesian women radio presenters